The Salem Church Parsonage is a historic church parsonage at 206 S. High Street in Menno, South Dakota. It was built in about 1913 and was added to the National Register in 2001.

It is a two-story, clapboard-sided house on a concrete and stucco foundation.  Its design has elements of Queen Anne architecture including an irregularly-shaped steeply pitched roof.

See also
Salem Church (disambiguation)

References

Churches in South Dakota
Properties of religious function on the National Register of Historic Places in South Dakota
Queen Anne architecture in South Dakota
Churches completed in 1913
Buildings and structures in Hutchinson County, South Dakota
Clergy houses in the United States
1913 establishments in South Dakota
National Register of Historic Places in Hutchinson County, South Dakota